BBC Radio 4 Extra (formerly BBC Radio 7) is a British digital radio station from the BBC, broadcasting archived repeats of comedy, drama and documentary programmes nationally, 24 hours a day. It is the sister station of BBC Radio 4 and the principal broadcaster of the BBC's spoken-word archive, and as a result the majority of its programming originates from that archive. It also broadcasts extended and companion programmes to those broadcast on Radio 4, and provides a "catch-up" service for certain programmes.

The station launched in December 2002 as BBC 7, broadcasting a mix of archive comedy, drama and current children's radio. The station was renamed BBC Radio 7 in 2008, then relaunched as Radio 4 Extra in April 2011. For the first quarter of 2013, Radio 4 Extra had a weekly audience of 1.642 million people and had a market share of 0.95%; in the last quarter of 2016 the numbers were 2.184 million listeners and 1.2% of market share.

According to RAJAR, the station broadcasts to a weekly audience of 1.7 million with a listening share of 1.4% as of December 2022.

History

BBC 7
The station was initially launched as BBC 7 on 15 December 2002 by comedian Paul Merton. The first programme was broadcast at 8pm and was simulcast with Radio 4. The station, referred to by the codename 'Network Z' while in development, was so named to reflect the station's presence on the internet and on digital television in addition to radio. The station broadcast mostly archived comedy and drama, in that the programme was either three or more years old or had been broadcast twice on their original station.

The station also broadcast a themed section for Children's programmes. This section carried a variety of programmes, including The Little Toe Radio Show (later renamed CBeebies Radio), aimed at younger children and consisting of short serials, stories and rhymes, and The Big Toe Radio Show and Arthur Storey and the Department of Historical Correction with phone-ins, quizzes and stories for the 8+ age group. The segment also hosted the only news programme on the network presented by the Newsround team.

The station won the Sony Radio Academy Award for station sound in 2003, was nominated for the Promo Award in 2004, and in 2005 received a silver for the Short-Form award, plus nominations in the speech and digital terrestrial station-of-the-year sections. Because of the station's archive nature the station was scheduled, produced and researched by 17 people, excluding presenters.

The station was renamed on 4 October 2008 as BBC Radio 7 in  an effort to bring it in line with other BBC Radio brands. It also coincided with the introduction of a new network logo for the station.

During this later period, Radio 7 saw growth in its audience, with a growth rate of 9.5% annually in 2010, going from 931,000 listeners in the first quarter of that year to 949,000 a quarter later, making it the second most listened to BBC digital radio station at the time. However, despite this growth, the audience of children between 4 and 14 was reported to be only at 25,000 and in February 2011 the BBC Trust approved a reduction in hours dedicated to children from 1,400 to 350.

BBC Radio 4 Extra

The BBC announced their intention to relaunch the station on 2 March 2010 and following a public consultation, the proposal was approved by the corporation's governing body the BBC Trust in February 2011. As a result, the station relaunched as BBC Radio 4 Extra on Saturday 2 April 2011. The relaunched station contained much of the same mix of programming with some new additions that reflected the new alignment with Radio 4, many of which were extended, archive or spin offs of flagship Radio 4 programmes.

On 26 May 2022, as part of planned cuts and streamlining with a greater focus on digital, the BBC announced plans to discontinue Radio 4 Extra as a broadcast station. It will be supplanted by BBC Sounds.

Broadcast

BBC Radio 4 Extra is broadcast from Broadcasting House in central London, although due to the nature of the channel very little of the channel's content is broadcast live from there with even the continuity announcements being pre-recorded. The channel uses ten continuity announcers to link between programmes. Notable announcers include Wes Butters, Kathy Clugston, Jim Lee, David Miles, Susan Rae, Alex Riley, Alan Smith, Chris Berrow and Steve Urquhart. Previous presenters, including those presenting Radio 7, include  Zeb Soanes, Penny Haslam, Helen Aitken, Rory Morrison and Michaela Saunders.

The station is broadcast nationally on digital radiovia the BBC National DAB multiplexand online via BBC Sounds and other services such as Radioplayer. It is also available on a number of digital television platforms; Freeview, Virgin Media, Freesat and Sky.

The controller of the station is Gwyneth Williams who is answerable to the Radio board in the BBC. BBC Radio 4 Extra is broadcast in stereo on television and online, although many of the older archive programmes were only recorded in mono. On DAB, all programmes are broadcast in mono, as the maximum bit rate is only 80kbps.

Programming
Although the current station is a rebranding of Radio 7 and contains a similar mix of archived programming, content has been brought further in line with BBC Radio 4 with new additions based upon their schedule. These include extended versions of programmes such as The News Quiz and Desert Island Discs, the broadcast of archived editions of the latter as Desert Island Discs Revisited. It has also previously included the addition of the programme Ambridge Extra, a more youth-orientated version of long-running radio soap The Archers, and an extended version of The Now Show.

Some programming is organised into programme blocks of similar programmes. The late night Comedy Club segment broadcasts "two hours of contemporary comedy" most nights of the week and is primarily hosted by Arthur Smith. A long-standing segment that remained following the change from Radio 7, it was previously fronted by Alex Riley and Phil Williams. Comedy previously available as CDs on the Laughing Stock label is also broadcast.

Drama is also broadcast, notably in The 7th Dimension segment. A long-running segment continued from Radio 7, the block airs speculative fiction, science fiction, fantasy and horror stories presented by Nicholas Briggs. The segment contains programmes including Doctor Who audio dramas starring Paul McGann as the Eighth Doctor, as well as programmes imported from overseas including American broadcasts The Twilight Zone and Garrison Keillor's Radio Show as well as Stuart McLean's Vinyl Cafe from Canada. The 7th Dimension was originally broadcast daily, but has now been reduced to weekends-only. With increasing repeats of old Radio 4 documentaries, interviews and "educational/cultural" programmes, some listeners are concerned that the station's original mandate to provide comedy, drama and entertainment is being increasingly sidelined.

Archive
Much of the channels schedule is formed of repeats from classic comedy and drama. The schedule spans The Goon Show (1950s) and Round the Horne (1960s), through Radio 2 favourites like The News Huddlines, Castle's On The Air and Listen to Les to recent Radio 4 shows such as Little Britain and Dead Ringers. Some of this content is newly discovered, such as copies of the version of Dick Barton Special Agent that were made for international distribution and early episodes of The Goon Show.

Original programmes
The station has broadcast original programmes. Newsjack is a topical news sketch show which encourages contributions from listeners. Spanking New on Seven was stand-up comedy, and the BBC New Comedy Competition a competition for new comedians. Those who went on to have their own series on Radio 7 include John-Luke Roberts with Spats and Miriam Elia with A Series of Psychotic Episodes.

The Mitch Benn Music Show featured comedy songs introduced by Mitch Benn. The Colin and Fergus' Digi Radio comedy sketch show ran for two series in 20052006. Serious About Comedy was a weekly show presented by Robin Ince in which comedians and comedy critics discussed comedy television, radio, DVDs, and films. Tilt was a satirical look at the week's news of views other than the norm. Knocker was a sitcom about a market researcher, written by and starring Neil Edmond.

Original Radio 7 programmes
While most shows on Radio 7 were repeats, original programmes included:

 Big Toe Books (Children's show)
 Serious About Comedy (Comedy review show)
 Tilt (Satirical sketch comedy)
 Newsjack (Satirical sketch comedy)
 Spats (Sketch comedy)
 Knocker (Sitcom)
 The Penny Dreadfuls Present… (Comedy)
 Undone (Sci-fi comedy)
 The Spaceship (Sci-fi comedy)
 Oneira (Sci-fi comedy)
 The Laxian Key (Sci-fi comedy)
 Cold Blood (Sci-fi drama)
 The Voice of God (Sci-fi drama)
 Slipstream (Sci-fi drama)
 A Series of Psychotic Episodes (Sketch comedy)
 CBeebies  Radio (Children's show)
 Colin and Fergus' Digi Radio (Sketch comedy)
 No Tomatoes (Sketch comedy)
 The Mitch Benn Music Show (Musical comedy)
 Spanking New on Seven (Stand-up)
 Play and Record (Sketch comedy)
 Pleased to Meet You (Comedy)
 Gus Murdoch's Sacred Cows (Comedy)
 Planet B (Sci-fi drama)
 Doctor Who: The Eighth Doctor Adventures (Sci-fi Drama)
 The Man in Black (Horror)
 The Scarifyers (Horror comedy)
 This is Pulp Fiction (Crime fiction)

Original Radio 4 Extra programmes
Original programmes made for Radio 4 Extra.

 Ambridge Extra (Soap opera, spin-off from The Archers)
 Arthur Smith's Balham Bash (Variety show, debuted on Radio 4 Extra before being aired on Radio 4)
 The 4 O'Clock Show (Chat show, including children's entertainment)
 Let's Get Quizzical (Documentary)
 Lord of the Flies (dramatisation of William Golding's novel)
 Meet David Sedaris (Comedy, debuted on Radio 4 Extra before being aired on Radio 4)
 The Nine Billion Names of God (readings from Arthur C. Clarke's short story collection of the same name)
 Sarah Millican's Support Group (Sketch show, debuted on Radio 4 Extra before being aired on Radio 4)
 What's So Funny? (Comedy review show)
 Neverwhere (Neil Gaiman's fantasy, first episode aired on Radio 4 with subsequent episodes on Radio 4 Extra)

See also
 List of BBC radio stations

References

External links
 

 
4 Extra
Comedy radio stations
British radio comedy
Radio stations established in 2002
2002 establishments in the United Kingdom
Radio stations in the United Kingdom
Digital-only radio stations